Keskpolügoon or the Central training area is the main military training field of the six areas used by the Estonian Defence Forces. It borders with three other rural municipalities: Kadrina to the east, Tapa to the south (both in Lääne-Viru County) and Anija Parish of Harju County to the south-west. To the west it borders the Põhja-Kõrvemaa Nature Reserve.

Organization 
The Keskpolügoon is part of the Logistic center 
The Keskpolügoon operates the training area according to civil agreements with the local municipalities, plans, and organizes the combat firing exercises, prepares and carries out practical training in the use of the armed forces in accordance with the requirements.

History 
During the Soviet occupation of Estonia, Central training area was part of the Soviet Army artillery and tank training area with the area of 33,100 ha. The area was in active use from 1952 to 1992.

Establishment 
Keskpolügoon was created on 15 May 1997 and was officially established as the central training area of the Maavägi on 23 October 2001, with the Government Order No. 713 "Establishment of the Defense Forces Central training area."

References

External links 
 Map
 Official web

Military installations of Estonia
Kuusalu Parish